Houssine Kharja (born 9 November 1982) is a Moroccan former professional footballer who played as an attacking midfielder.

Born in France, he spent most of his career in Italy after starting out his senior career at Sporting CP, amassing Serie A totals of 117 games and 13 goals. He represented in the competition A.S. Roma, Internazionale and Fiorentina, amongst other clubs.

At international level, he represented the Morocco national team earning 78 caps and scoring 13 goals between 2003 and 2015.

Club career

Youth
Kharja began his career with Paris Saint-Germain's youth side and in 1998 he joined Gazélec Ajaccio.

Portugal
In 2000 he joined the Portuguese side Sporting CP.

Italy
After only one season for Sporting, he joined Ternana in 2001. He played four impressive Serie B seasons for the Rossoverdi, gaining a place in the Moroccan national team, and being loaned to Roma in 2005, with option to buy him in co-ownership deal for €3.6 million. Kharja played 12 matches and scored one goal during a 1–1 draw against Juventus.

At the end of the 2005–06 season, Roma decided not to extend Kharja's loan, so the Moroccan player returned to Ternana, but he refused this transfer because in the meantime the Rossoverdi had been relegated to Serie C1. Ternana considered him as their own player, and Lega Calcio Serie C even suspended him until 26 April 2007. After appeals, FIGC's court decided that Kharja was a free agent, and so, on 20 March 2007 he signed a three-year contract with Serie B team Piacenza. In January 2008, he was loaned to Siena for the second half of the season, with this deal being turned a permanent one on 11 July.

In June 2009, Genoa announced the club was reaching an agreement to sign the player and on 2 July the transfer from Siena was completed. Genoa got Kharja for €6.5 million, while Siena signed the remain 50% registration rights of Manuel Coppola for €1.5 million and the full rights of Gianluca Pegolo for €1 million.

It was announced on 29 January 2011, that Kharja had joined Internazionale on a loan deal with the option of Inter signing him permanently. He scored his first goal for Internazionale during his second appearance for the club against Bari on 3 February 2011. At the end of his loan spell, Inter decided not to give the player a permanent deal, and so he returned to Genoa.

On 18 August 2011, Fiorentina signed the player on a co-ownership deal, signing a two-year deal.

Qatar
On 29 June 2012, Kharja signed a two-year deal with Qatari club Al-Arabi.

He was involved in an altercation with Al Gharafa player Nenê on 19 March 2013 in a Qatari Stars Cup match. After Kharja persistently fouled Nenê for the majority of the match, Nenê was sent off in an unrelated incident after a challenge on one of Kharja's teammates. When Nenê attempted to protest the referee's decision, Kharja shoulder-blocked him, preventing him from reaching the referee. Nenê responded by elbowing Kharja in the back of the head. After a delayed reaction, Kharja attacked Nenê, who was then being restrained by teammates. This induced a brawl between the two teams.

Harsh sanctions followed after the match, with four players being fined and banned from match play as well as a member of Al Arabi's staff being fined and warned. Kharja received the most harsh penalty, being fined QR 380,000 and receiving a ten-game ban, the largest penalty in the history of the Qatar Stars League. Later, on 31 March, after a 4–1 defeat to Lekhwiya in the league, Al Arabi terminated his contract as a result of the aftermath of the brawl. He later stated that he had not received notification that his contract was terminated.

France
On 10 October 2014, Sochaux announced that Kharja had joined on a one-year contract after playing 16 years away from his native France.

Romania
In September 2015, Kharja joined Romanian defending champions Steaua București on a one-year deal. He made his Liga I debut in the 3–1 win against Concordia Chiajna, three days after signing the contract.

Career statistics

Club

International
Scores and results list Morocco's goal tally first, score column indicates score after each Kharja goal.

Honours
Inter Milan
Coppa Italia: 2010–11

Steaua București
League Cup: 2015–16

Morocco
Africa Cup of Nations runner-up: 2004

References

External links
 
 

1982 births
Living people
People from Poissy
Citizens of Morocco through descent
Footballers from Yvelines
Association football midfielders
Moroccan footballers
Moroccan expatriate footballers
Morocco international footballers
2004 African Cup of Nations players
2006 Africa Cup of Nations players
2008 Africa Cup of Nations players
2012 Africa Cup of Nations players
French sportspeople of Moroccan descent
Sporting CP footballers
Ternana Calcio players
A.S. Roma players
Piacenza Calcio 1919 players
A.C.N. Siena 1904 players
Genoa C.F.C. players
Inter Milan players
ACF Fiorentina players
Al-Arabi SC (Qatar) players
FC Sochaux-Montbéliard players
FC Steaua București players
Serie A players
Serie B players
Qatar Stars League players
Ligue 2 players
Liga I players
Expatriate footballers in Italy
Expatriate footballers in Portugal
Expatriate footballers in Qatar
Expatriate footballers in Romania
Moroccan expatriate sportspeople in Italy
Moroccan expatriate sportspeople in Portugal
Moroccan expatriate sportspeople in Qatar
Moroccan expatriate sportspeople in Romania
Olympic footballers of Morocco
Footballers at the 2012 Summer Olympics